Returning the Favor is an American reality web series that premiered on August 28, 2017 on Facebook Watch. It follows Mike Rowe as he travels across the United States in search of people who are giving back to their communities. At the end of each episode, those being profiled receive a surprise that allows them to do even more of whatever kind of good work they are doing. In July 2018, Facebook renewed the series for a fourth season which premiered on January 14, 2020. The show was canceled after four seasons in January 2021.

Production
Rowe credits his mother as being a source of inspiration for bringing his show to Facebook. After posting a video of his parents and monitoring how many people viewed it after it was posted to his Facebook page, he realized the potential audience reach that the social media site could afford.

On July 5, 2017, it was announced that Facebook had greenlit the production. The number and length of episodes had yet to be determined at the time. The show is referred to internally by Facebook as one of their "hero shows" alongside other programs such as Ball in the Family and Strangers.

On November 27, 2017, it was reported that Facebook had renewed the show for a second season consisting of 13 episodes. Facebook's vice-president of media partnerships Nick Grudin has said that the show has worked well on the platform because Rowe is "a very engaged creator, thinking through how to participate in natural ways with the audience in order to make and develop the storyline." Between the first and second seasons, Returning the Favor released seven short videos, labeled as "Micro Editions", that ran between 6 and 7 minutes in length. Some of these mini-episodes followed up on subjects covered in the first season.

On July 25, 2018, it was announced during the Television Critics Association's annual summer press tour that Facebook had renewed the series for a third season. On November 23, 2018, it was reported that season three would premiere on November 27, 2018.

Facebook cancelled the show on January 27, 2021.

Episodes

Season 1 (2017)

Season 2 (2017–18)

Season 3 (2018-19)

Season 4 (2020)

Awards
In November 2017, Returning the Favor was one of five shows cited by Got Your 6, an entertainment industry-affiliated veterans organization with a Got Your 6 certification. In recognizing the series, the organization specifically cited the pilot episode, featuring a former Army engineer running a therapeutic motorcycle building program for other veterans, and episode six, which featured a quadruple amputee Army veteran who runs an outdoor retreat for other veterans suffering from injuries.

See also
 List of original programs distributed by Facebook Watch

References

External links
 
 

Facebook Watch original programming
2010s American reality television series
2017 American television series debuts
2020 American television series endings
English-language television shows
American non-fiction web series